This is a list of monarchs of Wessex until AD 886. For later monarchs, see the List of English monarchs. While the details of the later monarchs are confirmed by a number of sources, the earlier ones are in many cases obscure.

The names are given in modern English form followed by the names and titles (as far as is known) in contemporary Old English (Anglo-Saxon) and Latin, the prevalent languages of record at the time in England.

This was a period in which spellings varied widely, even within a document. A number of variations of the details below exist. Among these are the preference between the runic character thorn (Þ, lower-case þ, from the rune of the same name) and the letter eth (Ð or ð), both of which are equivalent to modern ⟨th⟩ and were interchangeable. They were used indiscriminately for voiced and unvoiced /th/ sounds, unlike in modern Icelandic. Thorn tended to be more used in the south (Wessex) and eth in the North (Mercia and Northumbria). Separate letters th were preferred in the earliest period in Northern texts, and returned to dominate by the Middle English period onward.

The character ⁊ (Tironian et) was used as the ampersand (&) in contemporary Anglo-Saxon writings. The era pre-dates the emergence of some forms of writing accepted today; notably rare were lower case characters, and the letters W and U. W was occasionally rendered VV (later UU), but the runic character wynn (Ƿ or ƿ) was a common way of writing the /w/ sound. Again the West Saxons initially preferred the character derived from a rune, and the Angles/Engle preferred the Latin-derived lettering VV, consistent with the thorn versus eth usage pattern.

Except in manuscripts, runic letters were an Anglian phenomenon. The early Engle restricted the use of runes to monuments, whereas the Saxons adopted wynn and thorn for sounds which did not have a Latin equivalent. Otherwise they were not used in Wessex.

List

Timeline

Genealogy
The chart shows their (claimed) descent from the traditional first king of Wessex, Cerdic, down to the children of Alfred the Great. A continuation of the tree into the 10th and 11th centuries can be found at English monarchs family tree.

The tree is largely based on the late 9th-century Anglo-Saxon Chronicle, the West Saxon Genealogical Regnal List (reproduced in several forms, including as a preface to the [B] manuscript of the Chronicle), and Asser's Life of King Alfred. These sources are all closely related and were compiled at a similar date, and incorporate a desire in their writers to associate the royal household with the authority of being a continuation of a unified line of kingship descended from a single original founder.

One apparently earlier pedigree survives, which traces the ancestry of King Ine back to Cerdic. This first appears in a 10th-century manuscript copy of the "Anglian collection" of Anglo-Saxon royal genealogies. The manuscript is thought to have been made at Glastonbury in the 930s during the reign of King Æthelstan  (whose family traced their own royal descent back to Cerdic via a brother of King Ine), but the material may well date back to the earliest reconstructable version of the collection, ; and possibly still further back, to 725–6.  Compared to the later texts, this pedigree gives an ancestry for Ceolwald as son of Cuthwulf son of Cuthwine which in the later 9th-century texts sometimes seems confused; and it states Cynric as son of Creoda son of Cerdic, whereas the Chronicle annals go to some length to present Cerdic and Cynric as a father-and-son pair who land in and conquer the southern part of Wessex together (a narrative now considered spurious by historians).

Many of the links shown are disputed. Egbert, who became King of Wessex in 802, was probably of Kentish origin, and his ancestry back to Cerdic may have been invented to legitimize his claim to the throne of Wessex. There are also a number of discrepancies between different sources.

Key
 The red border indicates the monarchs
 The black border indicates the close relatives of the monarchs (parents, spouses and children)
 The blank box indicates other relatives.

See also 

List of royal consorts of Wessex
Governors of Roman Britain
List of legendary kings of Britain
Anglo-Saxon royal genealogies
List of English Monarchs

Notes

References
 Barbara Yorke (1995), Wessex in the early Middle Ages, A & C Black, ; pp 79-83; table p. 81

 
Wessex
Wessex